Lokum, also known as Turkish delight, is a family of confections based on a gel of starch and sugar.

Lokum may also refer to:
 Nokul, a type of pastry eaten in Turkey and Bulgaria
 The Danish word for toilet

See also
 Turkish Delight (disambiguation)